Glory Enough for All is a 1988 Canadian television movie directed by Eric Till and written by Grahame Woods, depicting the discovery and isolation of insulin by Frederick Banting and Charles Herbert Best. It was the winner of nine 1989 Gemini Awards. The film stars R. H. Thomson as Banting, and Robert Wisden as Best. It is based on the books The Discovery of Insulin and Banting: A Biography by historian Michael Bliss.

It was aired in November 1989 in the United States in two parts as part of the PBS show Masterpiece Theatre and introduced by Alistair Cooke.

Plot synopsis
The movie focuses on Banting and Best and their isolation of insulin at the University of Toronto for which Banting received the 1923 Nobel Prize along with John Macleod. A parallel story is told of Elizabeth Hughes, a young girl with diabetes.

Cast
R. H. Thomson as Frederick Banting
Robert Wisden as Charles Herbert Best
Michael Zelniker as James Collip
John Woodvine as J.J.R. Macleod
Martha Henry as Antoinette Hughes
Kate Trotter as Edith Roach
Leah Pinsent as Margaret Mahon
Rachel Blanchard as Melanie
Seana McKenna as Jessica Collip
Gerard Parkes as Duncan Graham
Heather Hess as Elizabeth Hughes

Reception
The movie was the winner of nine 1989 Gemini Awards including Best Dramatic Mini-Series, Best Performance by a Lead Actor, Best Performance by a Lead Actress, Best Writing, Best Photography, and Best Musical Score among others.

References

External links

1988 television films
1988 films
English-language Canadian films
CBC Television original films
Films directed by Eric Till
Films scored by Louis Applebaum
Gemini and Canadian Screen Award for Best Television Film or Miniseries winners
Canadian drama television films
1988 drama films
Biographical films about scientists
Films about Nobel laureates
Films about diseases
Films set in Toronto
1980s Canadian films